David Potts Jr. (November 27, 1794 – June 1, 1863) was an Anti-Masonic member of the U.S. House of Representatives from Pennsylvania.

Biography
Potts was born at Warwick Furnace, Pennsylvania, about eight miles from Pottstown, Pennsylvania.  He became an ironmaster, and owner and manager of Warwick Furnace. He was a member of the Pennsylvania House of Representatives from 1824 to 1826.

He was elected as an Anti-Masonic candidate to the Twenty-second and to the three succeeding Congresses.  He was not a candidate for renomination in 1838. Potts resumed his former business pursuits, and died at Warwick Furnace. Interment in Coventry Cemetery near Warwick.

Sources

The Political Graveyard

1794 births
1863 deaths
People from Chester County, Pennsylvania
Anti-Masonic Party members of the United States House of Representatives from Pennsylvania
19th-century American politicians
Members of the Pennsylvania House of Representatives
American ironmasters